BMP binding endothelial regulator is a protein that in humans is encoded by the BMPER gene.

Transcription

KLF15 is a strong and direct activator of BMPER expression which is inhibited by SP1. BMPER is inhibited by endothelin-1, which may be mediated by endothelin inhibition of KLF15.

References

External links

Further reading 
 
 
 
 
 
 

Extracellular matrix proteins